Anna Kerstin Otto (born 1972 in Frankfurt am Main) is a German painter.

Biography
In 1997–1999, Otto studied at Hochschule für Gestaltung, Offenbach, and Academy of Reykjavík, Iceland.
In 1999–2005, she studied at Städelschule, at Frankfurt am Main, where she studied with Ayse Erkmen and Michael Krebber.

Otto has exhibited at the Jacky Strenz Gallery. She participated in Open Studios. In 2006 Otto won the Villa Romana prize.

References

External links
"Udo Kittelman(MMK) im Gespräch mit Anna-Kerstin Otto." Exit und Voice: Gespräche im TAT/Frankfurt. 30. Mai 2004

1972 births
Living people
20th-century German painters
20th-century German women artists
21st-century German women artists
21st-century German painters
German women painters
Artists from Frankfurt